Vishwanath Bhoir is a politician from Kalyan, Maharashtra. He is current Member of Maharashtra Legislative Assembly from Kalyan West Vidhan Sabha constituency as a member of the Shiv Sena.

Positions held
 2019: Elected to Maharashtra Legislative Assembly

References

External links
  Shivsena Home Page 

Shiv Sena politicians
Living people
Year of birth missing (living people)